Rathakāra or the Chariot maker is mentioned in several Hindu scriptures such as Rigveda, Yajurveda, Atharvaveda, Saṃhitas etc. There are various types of Rathakāras mentioned in the texts, whose social status was not uniform, some enjoyed a very high status and some were degraded. Recent inscriptions found by Archeological department says Rathakaras are artisans, who were born out of Anuloma and Pratiloma.

Ratha or the chariot occupied a very important position in Vedic civilization. Many hymns are found in the Vedas praising the Ratha and the creator of the Ratha or the Rathakāra, who occupied an important role in the sacrifices or even day today life.

Ṛgveda (10.85.20), Ṛgveda (3.53.19) consist of hymns praising and describing Rathas. Even various deities are compared with Rathas and the deities riding them are also praised e.g., Ṛgveda (6.61.13)

Inscriptions
Some inscriptions refers to artisans as Rathakara and are said to have been born as Anuloma and Pratiloma. Anulomas are described as those who were the sons of high caste father and a low caste mother whereas Pratilomas means the sons of low caste father and a high caste mother.

Rathakāra in the Ṛgveda and the Purāṇas
The Rathakāra mentioned in Ṛgveda (1.6.32) indicates high status, and is associated with the formulae of placing the holy sacrificial fire in the Yajñakuṇḍa. According to the Śrautasūtras, Rathakāra is entitled to perform all the sacrifices. In many sacrifices like the Rājasuya, Rathakāra played a role of recipient of the offerings, e.g., Ratninaḥ in Rājasuya. Some sacrifices like Agnihotra, Darśapurṇamāsa are obligatory to them as they are entitled to place the holy fire in the sacrificial fire-altar.

Indra praises them in Ṛgveda (1.7.32), and are also praised for their dexterity. They are also identified with  Tvaṣṭr and Rbhus (Ṛgveda (1.6.32).

The progeny of this Tvaṣṭr is called Rathakāra in the Medini Koṣa Ṛgveda (1.6.32) and seems to have stand as an industrial population, and are associated with worship of the celestial beings like Ṛbhus and Tvaṣṭr. Their origins could be found in the ancient Rigvedic tribes Anu. The Ṛbhus are mentioned as belonging to the race of Aṅgiras, it seems that Anus and Aṅgiras are the same.

The term Rathakāra also implies to Bhṛgus, some Ṛṣis belonging to the race of Bhṛgus who in the Ṛgveda are twice referred to as building chariots. As per Ṛgveda Tvaṣṭr known as Rathakāra belongs to clan of the Bhṛgus, similarly as mentioned in the epic Mahabharata Tvaṣṭr or the Rathakāra is Śukrācārya's son, Śukrācārya is Bhṛgu's grandson and Vāruṇibhṛgu's son.

These Rathakāras were called Brahmins, expert in the architectural lore, and were engaged in making what is called Brahmayāgādi, the making of sacrificial implements, statues, production of royal crowns and thrones, gold chariot or Ratha which were necessary for many of the sacrifices. Many hymns are found in the Vedas praising the Ratha and the Rathakāra.

Some Purāṇas identify them with Viśvakarman. As mentioned in the texts like Skanda purāṇa and Padma purāṇa, Tvashtra praised as Rathakāra is mentioned to have married sage Jaiminī's daughter Candrikā. The Vāyu purāṇa and the Matsya purāṇa mentioned him as belonging to the Bhṛgus.

Niṣādapati
According to Hiraṇyakeśisutra by Yajñavalkya, a son begotten to a Niṣāda lady by a Brahmin was called as Niṣāda Rathakāra and was considered as Anārya or non aryan. If daughter of this Rathakāra is again married to a Brahmin and their daughter is married to a Brahmin, and a daughter born to them again married to a Brahmin, and so on till seven generations, then the son of the seventh Niṣāda Rathakāra's daughter attains brahminhood. The uplifted Niṣādapati and his progeny were entitled to perform the sacrifices and even the Brahmayāgādi. This Rathakāra's ways of earning a livelihood are stated as comprising chariots, carts and the like.

Rathakāra in the Atharvaveda
This systems regards the Rathakāra as an offspring of Māhiṣya, or the son of Kṣtriya husband and Vaiśya and Karaṇi or the daughter of Vaiśya husband and Śudra wife. Although such an origin cannot be considered as accurate historically.

Other scriptures
Other texts like Bṛhajjātiviveka and seers like Baudhāyana, Vijñāneśvara have mentioned many Rathakāras of mixed origin and having varying social status. According to some doctrines these Rathakāras have no right to take part in any of the sacrifices as they are degraded to Śudra. A Śudra is not initiated to Vedic studies hence no Upanayana, as the sacrificer has to know Vedas, hence Śudra cannot participate in any kind of Yajña. Baudhāyana on the other hand admits this degraded  Rathakāra to the ceremony of Upanayana, according to him fallen Rathakāra ought to perform this ceremony the rainy season. But some text mention that even a Śudra was allowed to participate in few sacrifices, and was even entitled to perform certain sacrifices like Pākayajñas, Śradhayajñas. But they were not entitled to perform the sacrifices which were strictly vedic. Sage Jaimini mentions another Rathakāra whose social status is inferior to Vaiśya but superior to that of a Śudra, and calls them Saudhavanas.

The confusion about the term Rathakāra
The varna of Rathakāra is not explicitly mentioned in Ṛgveda, Āpastamba maintains that Rathakāra is not a separate caste, but one of the three high castes viz. Brāhmaṇa, Kṣtriya, Vaiśya, who has embraced the occupation of chariot making. Ṛgvedic Rathakāra to belongs to Brahmaṇa varṇa, as rest four varṇas were not entitled to place the sacrificial fire in the pyre.

For all above obvious reasons the Śāstric materials did not conclusively distinguish between them as a result foreign scholars and Indologists like Albrecht Weber (cf. Indische Studien) and his followers have misinterpreted the meaning of the word Rathakāra.

See also
Ṛgveda
Yajña
Ṛgvedic tribes
Ratha

Citations

Rigveda